Newry Bosco GFC are a Gaelic Athletic Association gaelic football club from Newry, County Armagh, Northern Ireland.

Although the club plays its home games at Jack Mackin Park which is in County Armagh, Bosco plays in the South Down league.

History

Chronology
2014: G4MO Established

2011: Received: IRISH NEWS SPECIAL RECOGNITION AWARD

2010: IRISH NEWS CLUB OF THE YEAR as South Down Under 14 'B' League Champions

2009: All County Division 4 League Champions 
(promoted with 100% league record going undefeated all season in the league)

2007:
All County Junior Football Champions 
South Down Under 16 Football League 
All County Under 14 'B' Football Championship 
South Down Under 14 'B' Football Championship 
South Down Ladies Under 14 Football Championship

2005:
South Down Under 12 'B' Football Championship

2004 
All County Senior Ladies Football Championship 
All County Senior Ladies Football League 
All County Under 14 Football League

2002: 
Ulster Under 17 Club Football Championship 
All County Minor Football Championship 
All County Minor Football League 
South Down Minor Football Championship 
South Down Under 12 'A' Football Championship 
All County Senior Ladies Football Championship (as Iveagh Bosco) 
All County Senior Ladies Football League (as Iveagh Bosco)

2001:
All County Senior Ladies Football Championship (as Iveagh Bosco) 
All County Senior Ladies Football League (as Iveagh Bosco) 
All County Under 16 'A' Football Championship 
South Down Under 12 Football League 
South Down Under 11 Football League

1999: 
Ulster Intermediate Ladies Football Championship 
All County Senior Ladies Football Championship (as Iveagh Bosco) 
All County Senior Ladies Football League (as Iveagh Bosco)

1998: 
All County Senior Ladies Football Championship (as Iveagh Bosco) 
All County Senior Ladies Football League (as Iveagh Bosco)

1996: All County Intermediate Football Championship

1990: All County Senior Reserve Football Championship

1981: 
All County Under 12 'A' Football Championship 
South Down Under 12 'A' Football Championship

1980: South Down Under 12 'A' Football Championship

1975:
All County Minor Football Championship 
South Down Minor Football League 
All County Under 16 'A' Football Championship 
South Down Under 16 'A' Football Championship 
South Down Under 16 Football League

1972: South Down Under 16 Football League

Successes per age group: 
All County Division 4 Champions 2009 
County Intermediate Championship 1996 
County Junior Championship 2007 
County Senior Reserve Championship 1990 
County Minor Championship 1975 and 2002 
County Minor League 2002 
South Down Minor League 1975 and 2002 
Ulster U17 Championship 2002 
County U16 Championship 1975 and 2001 
South Down Under 16 Championship 1975 
South Down U16 League 1972, 1975 and 2007 
County U14 League 2004 
County Under 14 'B' FC 2007 
South Down Under 14 'B' FC 2007 
South Down Under 14 'C' League 2010 
County U12 Championship 1981 
South Down U12 Championship 1980, 1981 and 2002 
South Down U12 'B' Championship 2005 
South Down U12 League 2001 
South Down U11 League 2001

See also
Down Senior Club Football Championship
List of Gaelic Athletic Association clubs

References

External links
Official Newry Bosco GAA Club website
Official Down County website

Gaelic games clubs in County Down
Gaelic football clubs in County Down
Newry